Krndija is a mountain in Slavonia, Croatia, extending eastwards from Papuk. It is located south of Orahovica and Našice and north of Požega.

The westernmost point of Krndija is the mountain pass that connects Orahovica with Kutjevo; the easternmost point is hard to determine, as it gradually passes into the lowland area near Đakovo and further east near Vinkovci.

The peak of the central part of Krndija is at 263 meters of altitude.

There are several theories about the origins of the name "Krndija". It's almost certainly not of Croatian origin. One is that it is related to the Greek word χορδή (itself without a widely accepted etymology), in the sense "the border between the two territories." One is that is comes from the Indo-European root *(s)ker, meaning "to cut", in the sense "where you cut the trees." Perhaps the most likely one is that it comes from the Indo-European root *(s)kwer, meaning "steep". If so, the same root is seen in Scardona (the ancient name for Skradin) and Cersia (the ancient name for Cres).

References

Mountains of Croatia
Slavonia
Landforms of Požega-Slavonia County
Pannonian island mountains